Joran Vermeulen (born 5 June 2000) is a Dutch professional footballer who plays for the reserve team of Belgian club Lommel SK as a forward.

Career
Ahead of the 2019–20 season, Vermeulen returned to his former youth club, Lommel SK, beginning on the reserve team. In January 2020, Vermeulen returned to another of his former clubs, VV De Valk.

References

2000 births
Living people
Dutch footballers
Dutch expatriate footballers
FC Eindhoven players
Lommel S.K. players
Eerste Divisie players
Association football forwards
People from Valkenswaard
Dutch expatriate sportspeople in Belgium
Expatriate footballers in Belgium
VV De Valk players
VVV-Venlo players
Helmond Sport players
Footballers from North Brabant